Maria Elisabeth Rooth (born 2 November 1979 in Ängelholm, Sweden) is a retired Swedish ice hockey player. She is the only University of Minnesota Duluth women's hockey player to have her jersey retired. Rooth was alternate captain and one of the most experienced players on the Swedish national team beginning in 1996.

In 2015, Rooth was inducted into the IIHF Hall of Fame.

Playing career

NCAA
Rooth played collegiate hockey for the Minnesota–Duluth Bulldogs women's ice hockey program. She is ranked second in all-time leading scoring in Bulldogs history and was named to the WCHA All-Decade team in 2009. She is the Bulldogs’ all-time leading goal scorer with 119 career goals and ranks second in career points with 232. She was a three-time All-American (2001, 2002, 2003) and a three-time First Team All-WCHA selection. She was the league's Rookie of the Year in 2000. During the 2000-01 season, she was named the Most Valuable Player of the Frozen Four and MVP of the WCHA Tournament. On 21 January 2011, Rooth, along with Bulldog alumni Caroline Ouellette and Jenny Potter, took part in a ceremonial faceoff to mark the first hockey game at Amsoil Arena.

International
Rooth is a four-time Team Sweden Olympian. She accumulated nine goals and nine assists in 20 games during her Olympic career and played more than 260 games for Team Sweden. At the 2009 IIHF World Championship, Rooth netted her 100th career international goal, a first for a Team Sweden player.

2006 Winter Olympics
Rooth participated in the 2006 Turin Olympics. Alongside goaltender Kim Martin, she was instrumental in Sweden's upset against the United States in the semi-final game, ensuring Sweden at least a bronze medal and its first trip to the gold medal game. Rooth scored two goals in regulation time to tie the game and scored the clinching goal in the ensuing shootout. Overall at those Olympics, she scored five goals and four assists for a total of nine points, which ranked fourth, tied for highest non-Canadian player and highest among European players. She had a plus-minus of +1 and two penalty minutes.  She was named one of the tournament's top forwards.

Coaching
Rooth returned to Duluth as an assistant coach for the Minnesota–Duluth Bulldogs women's ice hockey program during the 2010-11 season.

Awards and honors
WCHA Team of the Decade (2000s) 
Three-time Patty Kazmaier Top-10 Finalist in 2000, 2001 and 2002.
Three-time WCHA All-Academic Team member in 2001, 2002 and 2003.
University of Minnesota Duluth Athletic Hall of Fame, inducted in 2013.
International Ice Hockey Federation Hall of Fame, inducted in 2015.

References

External links
 
 IIHF Hall of Fame Induction Ceremony video
 
 
 The official website of the Swedish Ice Hockey Association (In Swedish)
 Maria Rooth Hockey School

1979 births
Living people
Ice hockey players at the 1998 Winter Olympics
Ice hockey players at the 2002 Winter Olympics
Ice hockey players at the 2006 Winter Olympics
Ice hockey players at the 2010 Winter Olympics
Medalists at the 2002 Winter Olympics
Medalists at the 2006 Winter Olympics
Minnesota Duluth Bulldogs women's ice hockey players
Olympic bronze medalists for Sweden
Olympic ice hockey players of Sweden
Olympic medalists in ice hockey
Olympic silver medalists for Sweden
People from Ängelholm Municipality
Swedish expatriate ice hockey players in the United States
Swedish women's ice hockey forwards
IIHF Hall of Fame inductees
Sportspeople from Skåne County